Koltur is a village in Koltur, Faroe Islands. With a population of 2

References

Populated places in the Faroe Islands